Najad Yachts is a yacht builder headquartered in Henån, Sweden. According to the company website, the firm was founded in 1971. As of 2005, the company had 160 employees, and produced up to approximately 80 yachts per year. Worldwide sales include Europe, Australia, New Zealand, Turkey and the US.

History
Najad was founded in 1967 by Berndt Arvidsson and Thorwald Karlsson, in Kungsviken, Orust, Sweden. The first model, a 34-foot boat designed by Olle Enderlein, was built in 1971. It went from the at the time traditional long keel in favor of more natural end of the propeller shaft, while the engine was given a more appropriate location. Najadvarvet went bankrupt in 2011, after which the bankruptcy estate was bought by Nord West Yachts. Najad AB, the company's name after 2014, is now owned by Orust Quality Yachts AB, a subsidiary of Hexiron AB in Lund, which also owns Arcona Yachts.

Current models
 Najad 395 AC - new model 2018
 Najad 395 CC - new model 2018
 Najad 450 CC - new model 2016
 Najad 505 CC - Next Generation
 Najad 570 CC

Old models
 Najad 320, built 1983 – 1994 
 Najad 330, built 1993 – 1996 
 Najad 331, Built 1997 - 2003
 Najad 34, built 1972 – 1980 
 Najad 340, built 1987 – 1994 
 Najad 343, built 1981 – 1989 
 Najad 355, 
 Najad 360, built 1985 – 1994 
 Najad 361, built 1994 – 2001 
 Najad 37, built 1980 – 1983
 Najad 370,built 1991 – 1997
 Najad 371, built 1983 – 1985
 Najad 390, built 1984 – 1995
 Najad 391, built 1995 – 2003
 Najad 410
 Najad 420, built 1991 – 1996
 Najad 440, built 1986 – 1995
 Najad 440 CC
 Najad 441, built 1995 – 2001
 Najad 510, built 1990 – 1993
 Najad 520, built 1994 – 2001
 Najad 520DS, built 1995 – 2001
 Najad 373, built 1999 – 2005
 Najad 400, built 2001 – 2005
 Najad 405, built 2006 – 2009

See also
 List of sailboat designers and manufacturers
 Jeanne Socrates — winner of the Cruising Club of America's Blue Water Medal and oldest female to have circumnavigated the world single-handed, sailing her Najad 380, Nereida

References

External links 
 Najad - Yachts of Sweden Home Page

Manufacturing companies established in 1971
Swedish boat builders
Swedish brands
Yacht building companies
1971 establishments in Sweden